Katy Elizabeth Bourne  (born October 1964) is a Conservative politician who has served as the Sussex Police and Crime Commissioner since winning the inaugural election in Sussex in November 2012.  In 2016, she was re-elected for a second term in office. She was re-elected for a third term in 2021.

After selling her leisure business in 2005, Bourne held a number of political and regional government roles from 2009 onwards. During this period, she served as a Mid Sussex District Councillor.

Early life and education
Bourne studied from the age of 10 at Roedean School, which is located on the outskirts of Brighton, until she was 16, when she moved to Aberystwyth University. Her studies at Aberystwyth resulted in her graduating with a Bachelor of Arts degree in history.

Early career
Bourne was the founder of a leisure company, which taught people of a wide age range to dance. She sold the business in 2005, according to the Brighton Argus.

In 2008, Bourne was linked with her first political role, when she became involved with the Conservative Women's Organisation. She became one of three deputy chairmen in 2011, before serving as the national chairman until 2012.

Around the same time, Bourne became a district councillor for Mid Sussex, serving in the role from 2011 until 2013. She has also served as a governor of Oriel High School in Crawley since 2008.

Police and Crime Commissioner
On 15 November 2012, Bourne was elected as Police and Crime Commissioner for Sussex Police during the England and Wales Police and Crime Commissioner elections. She won the election with a majority of 24,426 over the Labour candidate. She was then appointed as director to the board of the national College of Policing in 2013.

One of her first initiatives as Police and Crime Commissioner, was the "tweetathon" on Twitter, with the BBC reporting that the reporting of domestic violence rose by more than 50% during a police Twitter campaign to highlight the issue of people not reporting the crime. The work in this field of crime, led to the Sussex police force becoming the first in England to be awarded a White Ribbon status, as part of the White Ribbon Campaign.

During her tenure as the Crime Commissioner for Sussex Police, Bourne achieved a number of goals. Between June 2012 and June 2013, Sussex crime statistics stated that overall crime had fallen by 7% in the county. Some crimes such as commercial robbery had a slight increase, but overall there were very few specific rises. The rise in burglaries led to the immediate announcement of "Operation Magpie" in late June 2013. The crackdown included roadside checks, in an attempt to disrupt any criminal gangs movements and also a voluntary tag for previous offenders, to rule them out of police investigations. As part of the strategy to tackle crime, Bourne set-up a fund worth £200,000, allowing community groups to apply for grants up to £5,000 to help prevent crime. While many counties were cutting staff during 2013, Bourne announced in the Chichester Oberserver that recruitment had begun for 120 volunteer police in Sussex, and also 60 additional PCSOs.

In 2014, In 2014, Bourne introduced a new study to measure public confidence in the Sussex Police. This included more than 2,000 young people aged between 15–24, which was seen by the BBC as a positive strategy to engage with young people by the Police force. During the same year, an initiative was launched to help victims of crime at a cost of £1.8 million. Bourne was also successful in securing £250,000 in extra funding for young victims of serious sexual crimes.

Bourne spoke at a meeting in Brighton about a number of issues in October 2014, including highway legislation. She suggested in passing that a cyclist could wear a form of identification, so the few that broke highway laws could be easily identified. The article lead to a number of remarks in the British media that she had suggested that cyclists should use number plates, something that was untrue. Her comments resulted in an interview with The Guardian in late 2014 where she stated, "I believed that cyclists should have some form of identification. Now what that identification is, I don't know."

Throughout 2014 and 2015, Bourne called regular performance and accountability meetings (PAMs) to measure the performance of Sussex Police. A number of improvements were made to 101 non-emergency call handling and burglary dwelling performance across throughout the two reported years. Satisfaction of police forces in the United Kingdom fell to an average of 80.4%, with Sussex Police achieving 93% in the same period. Due to budgetary cuts from central government, police forces were asked to find innovative ways of saving. New technologies were introduced by Sussex police under Bourne's leadership to create additional funds for the force. As part of the innovative move, it also received funding worth £2.348 million from the Home Office's Police Innovation Fund. Bourne also secured £1.1 million over a two-year period to transform the justice system in Sussex.

Sussex police announced in 2015 that it would be one of the first forces in the United Kingdom to implement an app to assist with the reporting of hate crimes. The app could be used to record evidence of hate crimes as they happen. During the speech at the launch of the app, Bourne stated that she hoped this would allow people to report more hate crimes, something the Sussex police force felt at the time was under-reported. In late 2015, it was announced that Bourne would be running for re-election as the Sussex Police and Crime Commissioner.

In late 2015, Bourne worked closely with the police force to introduce new measures to improve relationships with troubled young people, including the homeless. In early 2016, she worked alongside a number of senior politicians to trial an idea to reduce court costs in rural communities. The scheme would replace administrative hearings with virtual courts, allowing defendants, victims and witnesses to give evidence remotely to reduce costs. Reform's paper on digital justice, suggested such a scheme could result in savings of £27 million. She was also interviewed on BBC Breakfast in March 2016 about a pilot of a new scheme to tackle domestic violence. The pilot would provide one-to-one support in an attempt to change the behaviour of perpetrators.

Bourne was appointed Officer of the Order of the British Empire (OBE) in the 2019 Birthday Honours.

In April 2021, Bourne announced her intention to seek re-election for a third term in the 2021 England and Wales police and crime commissioner elections.

Personal life
Bourne resides in Mid Sussex with her husband and has two grown-up sons.

References

External links
 Official website
 Personal website
 Safer in Sussex 2012 PCC election manifesto
 Conservative PCC Election Broadcast Bourne's feature in the Conservative party political broadcast

1964 births
Living people
People educated at Roedean School, East Sussex
Alumni of Aberystwyth University
Conservative Party (UK) councillors
Councillors in West Sussex
Police and crime commissioners in England
Conservative Party police and crime commissioners
Officers of the Order of the British Empire
Women councillors in England
21st-century British women politicians